= National Social Integration Party =

Political party in Albania

National Social Integration Party (in Albanian: Partia Integrimi Social Kombetar) is a political party in Albania led by Petrit Memia.
